The British Academy Britannia Awards are presented by BAFTA Los Angeles, a branch of the British Academy of Film and Television Arts (BAFTA), as "a bridge between the Hollywood and British production and entertainment business communities." Established in 1989, it honours "individuals and companies who have dedicated their careers or corporate missions to advancing the art-forms of the moving image."

From 1989 to 1998, only an honorary award was handed out to an individual during the presentation. By 1999, the accolade was expanded to include additional awards which include: Stanley Kubrick Britannia Award for Excellence in Film, John Schlesinger Britannia Award for Excellence in Directing, Britannia Award for British Artist of the Year and Charlie Chaplin Britannia Award for Excellence in Comedy. The ceremony has traditionally presented during the months of October or November, and has been televised in the United States from 2010.

Ceremonies
Occurring in October or November, the Britannia Awards ceremony is presented at a black tie gala dinner, and has been held predominately at the Hyatt Regency Century Plaza and Beverly Hilton Hotel. Stephen Fry, Alan Cumming, and Jack Whitehall have each hosted the ceremony three times, the most of any other hosts. In the following table all reliable sources used make no mention of complete dates, ceremonies or hosts for the years prior to 1997.

Winners

1989–1998

1999–2009

2010–present

References

External links
Official website of the Britannia Awards
Official broadcast website of the Britannia Awards at BBC America

British Academy Los Angeles
American film awards
British film awards
Annual television shows
Award ceremonies in the United States
Awards established in 1989
1989 establishments in California
Lifetime achievement awards